The Asia-Pacific Journal of Public Health is a quarterly peer-reviewed public health journal published by SAGE Publications. It was established in 1987 and is the official journal of the Asia-Pacific Academic Consortium for Public Health. It covers  public health related issues, especially as relating to the Asia-Pacific region. The editor-in-chief is Wah Yun Low (University of Malaya).

Abstracting and indexing 
The journal is abstracted and indexed in CINAHL, EMBASE/Excerpta Medica, MEDLINE, PsycINFO, SafetyLit, Science Citation Index Expanded, Scopus, and the Social Sciences Citation Index. According to the Journal Citation Reports, the journal has a 2014 impact factor of 1.459.

References

External links 
 

Quarterly journals
SAGE Publishing academic journals
Publications established in 1987
Public health journals
English-language journals